Doral College is a private, non-profit institution of higher learning based in Doral, Florida.

Inception
Doral College was founded to offer college credits to charter high school students. The school is a joint venture between Doral Academy Preparatory School, a charter high school in South Florida, and Academica, a for-profit education company. The college is located on the campus of Doral Academy Preparatory School, and offers online and hybrid courses to its student body as well. In 2014, Academica was paid 7.5% of Doral College's fees, in addition to $9 million in management fees from publicly funded charter schools.

Accreditation
Doral College initially functioned without accreditation, which was a source of considerable controversy. When Manny Díaz was hired in 2013, he was tasked with earning accreditation from the Southern Association of Colleges and Schools (SACS), but this effort was not successful. Currently, Doral College is licensed by the Florida Commission for Independent Education (CIE) and accredited by the Distance Education Accrediting Commission.

The College was founded and granted initial licensure by the state of Florida in 2011 to offer Associates in Arts degrees.

Enrollment
The student base is made up entirely of high school students who take college classes concurrently with their high school classes. The college is available to students at specific area charter schools in South Florida. Enrollments total just over 700.

Presidents
 Anitere Flores (2011-2015)
 Douglas Rodriguez (2015-2021)
 Judith C. Marty (2021-present)

Legislator-to-Doral pipeline
Doral College is closely associated with three legislators who shape the legislative environment in which the for-profit operates. Conflict of interest allegations have circulated around parent company Academica, including a 2014 federal investigation.

Flores
The founding president of Doral, Anitere Flores, was a sitting state legislator when she took the job.

Fresen
Erik Fresen, who chaired the Florida House education budget committee, is brother-in-law of Fernando Zulueta, founder of Academica.

Díaz
Current Florida State Republican Senator Manny Diaz has been employed by Doral since 2013 with a six-figure salary. He currently serves as Chief Operating Officer of Doral College. As chairman of the Florida House Choice and Innovation Subcommittee, he worked to loosen rules for charter schools.

References

Universities and colleges in Miami-Dade County, Florida
Private universities and colleges in Florida
Distance Education Accreditation Commission